David Baldacci (born August 5, 1960) is an American novelist. An attorney by education, Baldacci writes mainly suspense novels and legal thrillers.

Biography

Early life and education
David Baldacci was born and raised in Richmond, Virginia.  He graduated from Henrico High School and earned a B.A. in political science from Virginia Commonwealth University and a Juris Doctor from the University of Virginia School of Law, after which he practiced law for nine years in Washington, D.C. He is of Italian descent.

Career

Baldacci began writing stories as a child, when his mother gave him a notebook in which to record them. He wrote for more than two decades, penning short stories and later screenplays without much success.

While practicing law, he turned to novel writing, taking three years to write Absolute Power. Published in 1996, it was an international best seller. To date, Baldacci has published 46 best-selling novels for adults as well as seven novels for younger readers.

Personal life and philanthropy
Baldacci resides in Fairfax County, Virginia, with his family.

Baldacci and his wife, Michelle, are the co-founders of the Wish You Well Foundation, which works to combat illiteracy in the United States by funding adult literacy and education programs. Baldacci became involved with the National Multiple Sclerosis Society after his sister, author Sharon Baldacci, was diagnosed with MS.

Baldacci served for 10 years on the board of trustees of the Mark Twain House & Museum in Hartford, Connecticut. In 2019, he donated $1 million to the home.

Works
Baldacci's first novel, Absolute Power, tells the story of a fictional American president and his Secret Service agents who are willing to commit murder in order to cover up the accidental death of a woman with whom the President was having an affair. It was adapted as a film, Absolute Power (1997), starring Clint Eastwood and Gene Hackman.

Baldacci wrote the screenplay for the film adaptation of his novel Wish You Well; the movie was shot on location in southwest Virginia with Academy Award winner Ellen Burstyn, Josh Lucas, and Mackenzie Foy in the lead roles.

Baldacci was a consulting producer on King & Maxwell, a TNT television series based on his characters Sean King and Michelle Maxwell. Jon Tenney and Rebecca Romijn starred.

The Christmas Train, Baldacci's eighth novel, was adapted in 2017 by Hallmark Channel as a Hallmark Hall of Fame feature presentation. The TV movie starred Dermot Mulroney, Kimberly Williams-Paisley, Danny Glover and Joan Cusack and was directed by Ron Oliver.

Baldacci's novel One Summer was adapted in 2021 for Hallmark Movies & Mysteries and starred Sam Page, Sarah Drew and Amanda Schull. 

Baldacci's novels have been published in over 45 languages and in more than 80 countries, with over 130 million worldwide sales as of 2018.

Bibliography

Sean King and Michelle Maxwell series 
 Split Second (2003)
 Hour Game (2004)
 Simple Genius (2007)
 First Family (2009)
 The Sixth Man (2011)
 King and Maxwell (2013)

The Camel Club series 
 The Camel Club (2005)
 The Collectors (2006)
 Stone Cold (2007)
 Divine Justice (2008)
 Hell's Corner (2010)

A. Shaw and Katie James series 
 The Whole Truth (2008)
 Deliver Us From Evil (2010)

John Puller series 
 Zero Day (2011)
 The Forgotten (2012)
 The Escape (2014)
 No Man's Land (2016)
 John Puller guests in the Atlee Pine thriller Daylight (2020)

Will Robie series 
 The Innocent (2012)
 The Hit (2013)
 The Target (2014)
 The Guilty (2015)
 End Game (2017)

Amos Decker series 
 Memory Man (2015)
 The Last Mile (2016)
 The Fix (2017)
 The Fallen (2018)
 Redemption (2019)
 Walk The Wire (2020)
 Long Shadows (2022)

Atlee Pine series 
Long Road to Mercy (2018)
A Minute to Midnight (2019)
Daylight (2020, John Puller crossover)
Mercy (2021)

Aloysius Archer series 
One Good Deed (2019)
A Gambling Man (2021)
Dream Town (2022)

Stand-alone novels 
 Absolute Power (1996)
 Total Control (1997)
 The Winner (1998)
 The Simple Truth (1998)
 Saving Faith (1999)
 Wish You Well (2001)
 Last Man Standing (2001)
 The Christmas Train (2003)
 True Blue (2009)
 One Summer (2011)
 The 6:20 Man (2022)
 Simply Lies (2023)

Short stories and novellas 
 Waiting for Santa (short story) (2002)
 No Time Left (short story) (2012)
 Bullseye (short story) Will Robie / Camel Club (2014)
 The Mighty Johns also known as The Final Play (novella) (2021)

For young readers

Freddy and the French Fries series 

 Freddy and the French Fries: Fries Alive! (Little, Brown and Company, 2005), Baldacci's debut novel for young readers
 Freddy and the French Fries: The Mystery of Silas Finklebean (Little, Brown and Company, 2006)

The 39 Clues series 

 Day of Doom (Scholastic Publishing, 2013), Book 6 in the "Cahills vs. Vespers" series of The 39 Clues books

Vega Jane series 

 The Finisher (Scholastic Press, 2014)
 The Keeper (Scholastic Press, 2015)
 The Width of the World (Scholastic Press, 2017)
 The Stars Below (Scholastic Press, 2019)

Adaptations
 Absolute Power (1997 film), starring Clint Eastwood, Gene Hackman, and Ed Harris
 King & Maxwell (2013 TV series), starring Jon Tenney and Rebecca Romijn
 Wish You Well (2013 film), starring Mackenzie Foy, Josh Lucas, and Ellen Burstyn
 The Christmas Train (2017 film), starring Dermot Mulroney, Kimberly Williams-Paisley, Danny Glover and Joan Cusack
 One Summer (2021 film), starring Sam Page, Sarah Drew and Amanda Schull

References

External links

 Official website
 
 
 Freddy and the French Fries website
 David Baldacci at site Goodreads.com

Interviews
 Profile in Newsweek, March 2009
 Modern Signed Books BlogTalkRadio Interview with Rodger Nichols about No Man's Land October 2016
 Modern Signed Books interviews David Baldacci, May 2018

1960 births
Living people
20th-century American novelists
20th-century American male writers
21st-century American novelists
American male novelists
American male screenwriters
American thriller writers
Henrico High School alumni
Writers from Richmond, Virginia
People from Vienna, Virginia
University of Virginia School of Law alumni
Virginia Commonwealth University alumni
Virginia lawyers
Lawyers from Richmond, Virginia
21st-century American male writers
Novelists from Virginia
Screenwriters from Virginia
American people of Italian descent